During the Parade of Nations section of the 1972 Summer Olympics opening ceremony, athletes from each country participating in the Olympics paraded in the arena, preceded by their flag. The flag was borne by a sportsperson from that country chosen either by the National Olympic Committee or by the athletes themselves to represent their country.

Parade order
As the nation of the first modern Olympic Games, Greece entered the stadium first; whereas, the host nation West Germany marched last, according with tradition and IOC guidelines. Announcers in the stadium read off the names of the marching nations in the host country's language, German, by actor and television personality Joachim Fuchsberger and music during the parade of nations is composed by Kurt Edelhagen.

Whilst most countries entered under their short names, a few entered under acronym or alternative names, mostly due to political and naming disputes. The People's Republic of the Congo entered as Congo (Kongo instead of Volksrepublik Kongo), South Korea (Republic of Korea) entered as Korea instead of Republik Korea, Taiwan (Republic of China) entered as Republik China, and South Vietnam (Republic of Vietnam) entered as Vietnam. Acronyms used during the ceremony like East Germany (German Democratic Republic), North Korea (Democratic People's Republic of Korea) and Soviet Union (Union of Soviet Socialist Republics) entered respectively as DDR (Deutsche Demokratische Republik), DVR Korea (Demokratische Volksrepublik Korea) and UdSSR (Union der Sozialistischen Sowjeterepubliken), United States in other hand entered the same as English, USA instead of its full German name Vereinigte Staaten von Amerika, and host nation West Germany (Federal Republic of Germany) entered as Germany (Deutschland instead of Bundesrepublik Deutschland or its acronym BRD) to avoid with the two Germanies.

121 nations entered the stadium with a combined total of 7,134 athletes. Eleven nations made their Olympic debut, namely Albania, Dahomey (now Benin), Gabon, North Korea, Lesotho, Malawi, Saudi Arabia, Somalia, Swaziland, Togo, Upper Volta (now Burkina Faso). Rhodesia's invitation to take part in the 1972 Summer Games was withdrawn by the International Olympic Committee four days before the opening ceremony, in response to African countries' (such as Ethiopia and Kenya) protests against the Rhodesian government. (Rhodesia did, however, compete in the 1972 Summer Paralympics, held a little earlier in Heidelberg.) Rhodesian athletes would have been marched between Republic of China and Romania.

List
The following is a list of each country's announced flag bearer. The list is sorted by the order in which each nation appears in the parade of nations. The names are given in their official designations by the IOC.

This table is sortable by country name (in German), the flag bearer's name, and the flag bearer's sport.

Notes

References

1972 Summer Olympics
Lists of Olympic flag bearers